Hollywood Opening Night is an American anthology television program that was broadcast on CBS in 1951-1952 and on NBC in 1952-1953. The NBC version was the first dramatic anthology presented live from the West Coast. Episodes were 30 minutes long.

CBS version 
The CBS version debuted on July 13, 1951, and ended on March 28, 1952. Until March 1, 1952, it was sponsored by Ennds chlorophyll tablets, manufactured by Pearson Pharmacal Company, that product's first venture into being a regular sponsor on TV. Episodes were reruns of stories produced by Music Corporation of America, originally shown on Stars Over Hollywood.

NBC version 
On NBC Hollywood Opening Night ran from October 6, 1952, until March 23, 1953. It replaced Lights Out and was replaced by Eye Witness. Besides the change in networks, the content changed from filmed episodes to live broadcasts, and the show began originating from the then-new Burbank studios of NBC. Host Jimmie Fidler introduced each episode from a set that resembled a theater, and he followed each episode with a preview of what was scheduled for the next week. Ethel Barrymore, Dorothy Lamour, and Gloria Swanson made their TV dramatic debuts on the program.

Competing shows on other networks included The Big Idea on DuMont, Perspective on ABC, and I Love Lucy on CBS. Pearson again was the sponsor. Fidler blamed the show's demise on its being broadcast at the same time as I Love Lucy, the top-rated TV program at that time. He wrote that he had often asked executives at NBC about moving the show to another night, but they kept it in the same time slot.

William Corrigan was the program's producer and director, with Marilyn Evans as associate director. Boris Sagal was the story editor, and Fred Albeck was the musical director.

Reception 
Columnist Jack Gould of The New York Times wrote that the premiere episode on NBC "was alleged to be a comic treatise on a baseball umpire". He compared one scene to "the Three Stooges of vaudeville" and noted that star William Bendix frequently was seen looking for a prompter to help with his lines.

Syndicated columnist John Crosby considered the fact that the program was performed before a live audience to be a disadvantage. He noted the overacting of the performers ("all pretty frantic") in the episode that he reviewed, attributing it to the actors' performing more for the in-house audience than for people who were watching on TV. He summarized Hollywood Opening Night as "a pleasant, well-lit, well-upholstered vacuum of a show which should kill a half hour of your time as painlessly as possible."

Episodes

References 

 

1951 American television series debuts
1953 American television series endings
1950s American anthology television series
American live television series
English-language television shows
NBC original programming
CBS original programming